Cercyeuptychia is a monotypic genus of Neotropic satyrid butterfly. Its sole species, Cercyeuptychia luederwaldti, is found in Brazil.

References

Euptychiina
Monotypic butterfly genera
Butterflies described in 1931